Inside Combat Rescue is a television series that originally aired on the National Geographic Channel. The show covers U.S. Air Force Pararescuemen (PJs), who rescue American and Allied personnel and civilians while on deployment at Kandahar Airfield in Afghanistan. 

The second season, consisting of three episodes and released over two years later, covers USAF Security Forces in Afghanistan.

Episodes

Season 1

Season 2

Production 

Footage was captured from more than 50 cameras mounted on the inside and outside of the Air Force's helicopters as well as the airmen's helmets.

References

External links
 Inside Combat Rescue at the National Geographic website

2010s American reality television series
2013 American television series debuts